The 1979 Trans America Athletic Conference men's basketball tournament (now known as the ASUN men's basketball tournament) was held March 1–3 at the Fant–Ewing Coliseum in Monroe, Louisiana. This was the first edition of the tournament.

  defeated  in the championship game, 90–69, to win their first TAAC/Atlantic Sun men's basketball tournament. The Indians, in turn, received a bid to the 1979 NIT.

Only six of the eight TAAC members participated in the inaugural tournament. However, this would be the only TAAC tournament for Oklahoma City, who subsequently joined the Midwestern City Conference for the 1979–80 season.

Bracket

References

ASUN men's basketball tournament
Tournament
TAAC men's basketball tournament
TAAC men's basketball tournament